KCRE-FM (94.3 FM) is a radio station broadcasting an adult contemporary format licensed to Crescent City, California, United States. The station is owned by Bicoastal Media Licenses Ii, LLC and features programming from ABC Radio, via the Hits & Favorites satellite radio service.

References

External links

FCC History Cards for KCRE-FM

CRE-FM